The Men's 100m backstroke event at the 2010 South American Games was held on March 27, with the heats at 11:13 and the Final at 18:25.

Medalists

Records

Results

Heats

Final

References
Heats
Final

Backstroke 100m M